Joseph Walters (11 December 1886 – 24 December 1923) was an English professional football forward who played in the Football League, most notably for Aston Villa and Oldham Athletic. He also played league football for Southend United, Rochdale, Millwall and Crewe Alexandra.

Personal life 
Walters was married with three children. He served as an Air Mechanic 1st Class with the Royal Air Force during the First World War and worked at No. 1 (Southern), No. 9 and No. 10 aircraft repair depots. Walters died of pneumonia in December 1923.

Honours 
Aston Villa
 Football League First Division: 1909–10

Career statistics

References

1886 births
Sportspeople from Stourbridge
English footballers
Association football inside forwards
English Football League players
1923 deaths
Royal Flying Corps soldiers
Royal Air Force personnel of World War I
Association football outside forwards
Stourbridge F.C. players
Aston Villa F.C. players
Oldham Athletic A.F.C. players
Accrington Stanley F.C. (1891) players
Southend United F.C. players
Millwall F.C. players
Rochdale A.F.C. players
Manchester North End F.C. players
Crewe Alexandra F.C. players
West Ham United F.C. wartime guest players
Deaths from pneumonia in England